Tolciclate (INN) is an antifungal medication.

See also 
 Tolnaftate

References 

Antifungals
Tetralins
Thiocarbamates
3-Tolyl compounds